The Everglades short-tailed shrew (Blarina peninsulae) is a species of shrew in the genus Blarina. It is endemic to Florida.

References

Blarina